Ischyrosonychini is a tribe of tortoise beetles and hispines in the family Chrysomelidae. There are about 7 genera and at least 70 described species in Ischyrosonychini.
 Juvenile stages have been described.

Genera
These seven genera belong to the tribe Ischyrosonychini:
 Asteriza Chevrolat in Dejean, 1836
 Cistudinella Champion, 1894
 Enagria Spaeth, 1913
 Eurypedus Gistel, 1834
 Eurypepla Boheman, 1854
 Physonota Boheman, 1854
 Platycycla Boheman, 1854

References

Further reading

External links

Cassidinae
Articles created by Qbugbot